The Slovak Basketball Player of the Year is the annual award for the best men's Slovak basketball player. The award is for the best male basketball player from the nation of Slovakia.

See also
Czech Player of the Year

References

External links
Slovak Basketball League Official Website 
Eurobasket.com Slovak Basketball League Profile

Basketball in Slovakia
Slovak Extraliga (basketball)
European basketball awards

cs:Basketbalista roku